The Gimmie Love Tour is the second concert tour by Canadian singer Carly Rae Jepsen. It was launched in support of her third studio album, Emotion (2015). The November 2015 dates were announced on 28 September 2015 (on sale on 2 October 2015). The February 2016 to March 2016 were announced on 9 December 2015 (on sale on 10 December 2015). The Gimmie Love Tour received positive reviews and was a success. Most dates were sold out.

Set list
The following set list is representative of the concert on 30 December 2015. It is not representative of all concerts for the duration of the tour.

"Run Away with Me"
"Making the Most of the Night"
"Good Time"
"Emotion"
"Warm Blood"
"Boy Problems"
"This Kiss"
"Gimmie Love"
"Tiny Little Bows"
"I Didn't Just Come Here to Dance"
"Tonight I'm Getting Over You"
"Your Type"
"When I Needed You"
"Love Again"
"LA Hallucinations"
"Favourite Colour"
"All That"
"Let's Get Lost"
"Curiosity"
"Call Me Maybe"
"I Really Like You"
Notes
"Fever" was added to the setlist replacing "Love Again" on March 11.
"First Time" was added to the setlist replacing "Tiny Little Bows" on March 23.

Shows

Box office score data

Notes

References

Carly Rae Jepsen concert tours
2015 concert tours
2016 concert tours